Särevere is a small borough in Türi Parish, Järva County in central Estonia.

Middle distance runner Laine Erik (born 1942) was born in Särevere.

References

Boroughs and small boroughs in Estonia